The Spain women's national under-18 and under-19  is a national basketball team of Spain and is governed by the Spanish Basketball Federation. 
It represents Spain in international under-19 and under-18 (under age 19 and under age 18) women's basketball competitions.

Tournament record

World Cup

European Championship

See also
 Spain women's national basketball team
 Spain women's national under-17 basketball team
 Spain men's national under-19 basketball team

References

Women's national under-18 basketball teams
Women's national under-19 basketball teams
Basketball